Inharrime is a small town in Inharrime District in southern Mozambique on the shores of some coastal lakes.

Transport 

It was once served by an isolated narrow gauge railway from the port of Inhambane.  It is now accessible by bus services from the capital of Mozambique Maputo.  Smaller buses called chapas run between Inharrime and Inhambane several times per day.

Casa Laura Vicuña 
Casa Laura Vicuña is an institution found in Inharrime in 2004 by the Salesian Sisters of Mozambique.  It offers various services to the surrounding community, including an orphanage that provides a home for 90 girls age three and older, a large farm and animal husbandry operation, a bakery, and a government-staff primary and secondary school (pre-K through 12th grade as of 2011).  The sisters and their collaborators provide literacy classes for local women and offer nutritional education support for children from families without sufficient resources.

International Support 

The American NGO Friends of Inharrime serves the people of the district of Inharrime in conjunction with the Salesian Sisters' school and orphanage located in the district.  Programs provided include nutritional support to children through a sponsorship program (monthly donations of food to each child), as well as financial support to pay for education and medical expenses.

See also 

 Transport in Mozambique
 Railway stations in Mozambique

References

External links 
 Friends of Inharrime

Populated places in Inhambane Province